Vanadium oxide may refer to:

 Vanadium(II) oxide (vanadium monoxide), VO
 Vanadium(III) oxide (vanadium sesquioxide or trioxide), V2O3
 Vanadium(IV) oxide (vanadium dioxide), VO2
 Vanadium(V) oxide (vanadium pentoxide), V2O5
 Vanadium(VI) oxide (vanadium hexoxide), a green oxide produced by a combination of hydrogen peroxide and vanadium metal

In addition to these principal oxides of vanadium, various other distinct phases exist:

 Phases with the general formula VnO2n+1 exist between V2O5 and VO2.  Examples of these phases include V3O7, V4O9 and V6O13.
 Phases with the general formula VnO2n−1 exist between VO2 and V2O3. Called Magnéli phases for Arne Magnéli, they are examples of crystallographic shear compounds based on  the rutile structure. Examples of Magnéli phases include V4O7, V5O9, V6O11, V7O13 and V8O15.
 V3O5 appears as the mineral oxyvanite.

Many vanadium-oxygen phases are non-stoichiometric.

References